"The Velvet Alley" was an American television play broadcast on January 22, 1959 as part of the CBS television series, Playhouse 90.  Rod Serling was the writer and Franklin Schaffner the director. The cast included Art Carney and Leslie Nielsen.

Plot
A freelance writer in New York sells a script to Playhouse 90 and moves to Los Angeles. He becomes a success financially but neglects his wife and ends up being divorced and losing the respect of his father.

Cast
The cast included the following:

 Art Carney as Ernie Pandish
 Leslie Nielsen as Eddie Kirkley
 Katharine Bard as Pat Pandish
 Jack Klugman as Max Salter
 Bonita Granville as Mrs. Kirkley
 George Voskovec as Steve Pandish
 Alexander Scourby as Harvey Diedrich
 David White as Freddie Henderson
 Micky Braddock, aka Micky Dolenz, as Melvin
 Eddie Ryder as Julius
 Martha Wentworth as Mrs. Cowznoski
 John Conwell as Kirkley's associate
 Dianne Cannon as Gloria
 Burt Reynolds as the Actor

Barry Sullivan hosted the broadcast.

Production
The program aired on January 1, 1959, on the CBS television series Playhouse 90. Rod Serling wrote the teleplay. Franklin Schaffner was the director and Herbert Brodkin the producer.

Reception
Jack Gould of The New York Times wrote that it lacked the searching insight of some of Serling's works, "but it was still a ninety-minute play of fairly consistent interest and the uncompromising final curtain carried its own power." Gould also praised Jack Klugman for an "exceptionally good" performance as the writer's agent.

References

1959 American television episodes
Playhouse 90 (season 3) episodes
1959 television plays